The Sacramento Open was a golf tournament on the LPGA Tour, played intermittently from 1951 to 1962. It was played in Sacramento, California at three different courses: the Del Paso Country Club in 1951 and 1961, the Bing Maloney Golf Course in 1953, and at the Valley Hill Country Club in 1962.

Winners
Sacramento Open
1962 Ruth Jessen

Sacramento Valley Open
1961 Mickey Wright

Barbara Romack Open
1953 Betsy Rawls

Sacramento Women's Invitational Open
1951 Betsy Rawls

References

Former LPGA Tour events
Golf in California
Sports in Sacramento, California
Women's sports in California